"This Is Love" is a song written and recorded by American hip hop artist will.i.am for his fourth studio album, #willpower. The song features vocals from Dutch singer-songwriter Eva Simons. "This Is Love" was released as the lead single from #willpower on June 1, 2012, and the song made its debut on Capital FM on May 14, 2012. The music video, directed by will.i.am himself, was released on May 25, 2012.

Background and development
The song was co-produced by Swedish House Mafia DJ's, Steve Angello and Sebastian Ingrosso. Work on the song started in late December 2011, and was partially recorded and completely mixed outside of the recording studios, on will.i.am's personal laptop. Eva Simons, whose vocals are featured on "This Is Love", was personally asked by will.i.am himself to lend vocals to the song. Simons told MTV News,
"He is super creative, and we kind of have the same energy: We can't sit still. We were in the studio, and he had this track, and he's like, 'Yo, Eva, would you like to do this song with me?' And we had been recording a couple tracks before, so he knows what I'm capable of and he trusts me, and we don't really know each other for that long, but he trusts me. I recorded it, and he mixes it straight away from his laptop ... and it's done. That's so beautiful — not only is he super creative and knows what he wants, but he also sees when other people are creative as well. He's not afraid to collaborate."

Music video

The music video for "This Is Love" was shot in London, United Kingdom, with part of it shot at Potter's Fields on the South Bank of the Thames near Tower Bridge, in mid-May. It was released via VEVO on May 25, 2012.

The music video starts with will.i.am playing a Grand Piano on the grass on the south bank of the Thames near Tower Bridge, engraved with the brand new #willpower era style will.i.am logo. He is accompanied by a laptop, displaying pictures of a nightclub (Cirque Le Soir in Soho, with Eva Simons appearing inside. During Simons' bridges and choruses, the video crosses to the nightclub, displaying pictures of the club in action, Simons and Adams inside singing their respective verses. Over time, the video crosses back and forth between will.i.am at South Bank and Eva Simons inside the night club. It ends with both Adams and Simons at South Bank, with a group of violinists during the final chorus and pyrotechnic displays during Simons' final vocal chorus.

Track listing

Chart and sales performance
The song is the first solo track by will.i.am to reach number one in the United Kingdom, where it sold 102,000 copies in its first week on sale. The song has sold 403,000 copies in the UK in 2012, and was the 39th best-selling single of 2012. It has reached the top-ten in 17 countries worldwide, whilst reaching number one in 10 of those.

Charts and certifications

Weekly charts

Year-end charts

Certifications

Release history

References

External links 
will.i.am - "This is Love" featuring Eva Simons on VEVO

2012 singles
Will.i.am songs
Eva Simons songs
Song recordings produced by will.i.am
Interscope Records singles
Songs written by Max Martin
Songs written by will.i.am
Irish Singles Chart number-one singles
Number-one singles in Norway
Number-one singles in Scotland
UK Singles Chart number-one singles
Ultratop 50 Singles (Flanders) number-one singles
Songs written by Sebastian Ingrosso
Songs written by Steve Angello
2012 songs
Songs written by Eva Simons
Song recordings produced by Steve Angello
Song recordings produced by Sebastian Ingrosso